The 2009 World Allround Speed Skating Championships were held at the indoor ice rink of the Vikingskipet Olympic Arena in Hamar (Norway) on 7 and 8 February 2009.

The Czech Martina Sáblíková and the Dutch Sven Kramer became world champion.

Martina Sáblíková is the first Czech Allround champion.

Sven Kramer won for the third time. He also won the Dutch Allround and European Allround three times

Other skaters who also won the World Allround Championships three times are:
 Jaap Eden (1893,1895,1896)
 Oscar Mathisen (1912–1914)
 Michael Staksrud (1930,1935,1937)
 Hjalmar Andersen (1950–1952)
 Oleg Goncharenko (1953,1956,1958)
 Ard Schenk (1970–1972)
 Eric Heiden (1977–1979)
 Johann Olav Koss (1990,1991,1994)

Women's championships

Day 1

Day 2

Allround results 

NQ = Not qualified for the 5000 m (only the best 12 are qualified)DQ = DisqualifiedNS = Not started

Notes

 On 1 July 2009, the ISU found Pechstein guilty of a violation of the anti-doping rules, and disqualified her from the competition. The decision is subject to an appeal at the Court of Arbitration for Sport. Pechstein skated the 500 metres in 39.74 seconds and the 3,000 metres in 4 minutes 6.00 seconds.

Men's championships

Day 1

Day 2

Allround results 

NQ = Not qualified for the 10000 m (only the best 12 are qualified)DQ = disqualifiedNS = Not started* Fall

Rules 
All 24 participating skaters are allowed to skate the first three distances; 12 skaters may take part on the fourth distance. These 12 skaters are determined by taking the standings on the longest of the first three distances, as well as the samalog standings after three distances, and comparing these lists as follows:

 Skaters among the top 12 on both lists are qualified.
 To make up a total of 12, skaters are then added in order of their best rank on either list. Samalog standings take precedence over the longest-distance standings in the event of a tie.

See also 
 Speed skating at the 2006 Winter Olympics

References

External links 
 Resultaten op IsuResults.eu

World Allround Speed Skating Championships, 2009
2009 World Allround
World Allround, 2009
Sport in Hamar